The following is a list of municipal presidents of Hermosillo in Sonora state, Mexico.

See also
 
 Hermosillo history

References

Hermosillo
People from Hermosillo
Politicians from Sonora
History of Sonora